Bermuda Waterfall is a studio album by Canadian singer Sean Nicholas Savage. It was released in May 2014 by Arbutus Records.

Track listing

References

2014 albums
Sean Nicholas Savage albums
Arbutus Records albums